Joyce Adwoa Akoh Dei is a Ghanaian politician and a member of the New Patriotic Party (NPP). She was the member of parliament for Bosome-Freho constituency in the Ashanti Region of Ghana.

Early life and education
Akoh Dei  was born on 12 October 1965 in Asiwa, Ashanti Region. She holds a diploma in Christian Ministry, and an NVQ Level 3 from the National Council for Vocational Qualifications and City and Guilds 7306 from City and Guilds.

Career 
Joyce Adwoa Akoh Dei is a business woman and a Ghanaian Politician where she belongs to the New Patriotic Party (NPP).  She holds a level 3/Adult and further Education Teachers Certificate.

Personal life
She is a Christian. She is divorced with three children.

References

Living people
1965 births
New Patriotic Party politicians
Ghanaian MPs 2017–2021
21st-century Ghanaian women politicians
Women members of the Parliament of Ghana